ITT Inc., formerly ITT Corporation, is an American worldwide manufacturing company based in Stamford, Connecticut. The company produces specialty components for the aerospace, transportation, energy and industrial markets. ITT's three businesses include Industrial Process, Motion Technologies, and Connect and Control Technologies. 

ITT has approximately 10,000 employees in more than 35 countries and serves customers in well over 100 countries. The company's long-standing brands include Goulds Pumps, Cannon connectors, KONI shock absorbers and Enidine energy absorption components.

The company was founded in 1920 as International Telephone & Telegraph. During the 1960s and 1970s, under the leadership of CEO Harold Geneen, the company rose to prominence as the archetypal conglomerate, deriving its growth from hundreds of acquisitions in diversified industries.

ITT divested its telecommunications assets in 1986. In 1995, the company sold off its hospitality portfolio, including Sheraton Hotels and Resorts. In 1996, the current company was founded as a spinoff of ITT as ITT Industries, Inc. It later changed its name to ITT Corporation in 2006.

In 2011, ITT spun off its defense businesses into a company named Exelis (now part of L3Harris Technologies), and its water technology business into a company named Xylem Inc. ITT Corporation changed its name to ITT Inc. in 2016.

History

Beginnings and early acquisitions
The brokers Colonel Sosthenes Behn and his brother Hernan Behn formed International Telephone & Telegraph (ITT) in 1920. The brothers had acquired the Puerto Rico Telephone Company in 1914, along with the Cuban-American Telephone and Telegraph Company and a half-interest in the Cuban Telephone Company. ITT's first major expansion came in 1923, when it consolidated operators in the telecoms market in Spain into what eventually became Telefónica. From 1922 to 1925 ITT purchased a number  of European telephone companies.

In 1925 ITT purchased several companies from Western Electric, as  Bell had agreed to "divest" itself of its international operations. They included the Bell Telephone Manufacturing Company (BTM) of Antwerp, Belgium, which manufactured rotary system switching-equipment, and the British International Western Electric, which was renamed Standard Telephones and Cables (STC). Compagnie Générale d'Electricité later purchased BTM; Nortel later purchased STC.

In the 1930s, ITT purchased German electronic companies Standard Elektrizitätsgesellschaft (SEG) and Mix & Genest (both of which were internationally active companies) and Romanian telecommunications monopoly  Societatea Anonima Română de Telefoane. Its only serious rival was the Theodore Gary & Company conglomerate, which operated a subsidiary, Associated Telephone and Telegraph, with manufacturing plants in Europe.

In the United States, ITT acquired the various companies of the  Mackay Companies in 1928 through a specially organized subsidiary corporation, Postal Telegraph & Cable. These companies included the Commercial Cable Company, the Commercial Pacific Cable Company, Postal Telegraph, and the Federal Telegraph Company.

German subsidiaries in the Nazi period 
On August 3, 1933, Adolf Hitler received Sosthenes Behn (then the CEO of ITT) and his German representative, Henry Mann, in one of his first meetings with US businessmen.

In his book Wall Street and the Rise of Hitler, Antony C. Sutton claims that ITT subsidiaries made cash payments to SS-leader Heinrich Himmler. ITT, through its subsidiary C. Lorenz AG, owned 25% of Focke-Wulf, the German aircraft-manufacturer, builder of some of the most successful  Luftwaffe fighter-aircraft. In the 1960s, ITT Corporation won $27 million in compensation for damage inflicted on its share of the Focke-Wulf plant by  Allied bombing during World War II. In addition, Sutton's book uncovers that ITT owned shares of Signalbau AG, Dr. Erich F. Huth (Signalbau Huth), which produced for the German Wehrmacht radar equipment and transceivers in Berlin, Hanover (later Telefunken factory) and other places. While ITT - Focke-Wulf planes were bombing Allied ships, and ITT lines were passing information to German submarines, ITT direction-finders were saving other ships from torpedoes.

In 1943 ITT became the largest shareholder of Focke-Wulf Flugzeugbau GmbH with 29%, and remained so for the duration of the war. This was due to Kaffee HAG's share falling to 27% after the death in May of Kaffee HAG chief, Dr Ludwig Roselius. OMGUS documents reveal that the role of the HAG conglomerate could not be determined during WWII.

Post-war acquisitions 
In 1951, ITT purchased Philo Farnsworth's television company to break into that market. At the time Farnsworth was also developing the Fusor  fusion reactor, which was funded by ITT until 1967. Also in 1951, ITT bought a majority interest in the Kellogg Switchboard & Supply Company (founded in 1897 as a pioneer in "divided-multiple" telephone switchboards) and bought the remaining shares the next year. ITT changed the company's name to ITT Kellogg. After merging Federal Telephone and Radio Corporation into ITT Kellogg and combining manufacturing operations the name again changed to ITT Telecommunications, eventually reverting to ITT Kellogg.

One prominent subsidiary of this was the American Cable and Radio Corporation, which operated the  transatlantic cables of the Commercial Cable Company, among other ventures.  It bought Philadelphia-based heating and air-conditioning manufacturer John J. Nesbitt Inc. 
In 1968 the company purchased Levittown homebuilder Levitt & Sons for a reported $90 million.

In 1972 the KONI Group, manufacturer of shock absorbers was added to the list of ITT's acquisitions.

International telecommunications 
International telecommunications manufacturing subsidiaries included Standard Telephones and Cables in the United Kingdom and Australia, Indosat in Indonesia, Standard Elektrik Lorenz (today part of Nokia Germany) and  Gesellschaft für Metallurgie und Elektronik mbH (acquired from Clevite in 1965; now TDK-Micronas) in Germany, BTM in Belgium, and CGCT and LMT in France. These companies manufactured equipment according to ITT designs including the (1960s) Pentaconta crossbar switch and (1970s) Metaconta D, L and 10c Stored Program Control exchanges, mostly for sale to their respective national telephone administrations. This equipment was also produced under license in Poznań (Poland), and in  Yugoslavia and elsewhere. ITT was the largest owner of the LM Ericsson company in Sweden, but sold out in 1960.

Alec Reeves, an ITT employee in France in the 1930s, developed pulse-code modulation (PCM) innovations, upon which future digital voice-communication was based; and Charles K. Kao, working at STC  in the UK, pioneered the use of optical fiber from 1966, for which he was awarded the 2009 Nobel Prize in Physics.

Harold Geneen appointment 
In 1959, Harold Geneen became CEO. Using leveraged buyouts, he turned the minor acquisitions of the 1950s into major growth during the 1960s. In 1965, ITT attempted to purchase the ABC television network for $700 million. The deal was halted by federal antitrust regulators who feared ITT was growing too large. In order to continue growing while not running afoul of antitrust legislation, it moved to acquire companies outside of the telecommunications industry. Under Geneen, ITT bought over 300 companies in the 1960s, including some hostile takeovers. The deals included well-known businesses like the Sheraton Hotel chain, Wonder Bread maker Continental Baking, Rayonier, and Avis Rent-a-Car. ITT also absorbed smaller operations in auto parts, energy, books, semiconductors and cosmetics. In 1966, ITT acquired Educational Services, Inc., an operator of for-profit schools, which became ITT/ESI. When ITT attempted to acquire The Hartford insurance company in 1970, the US Justice Department filed suit, and ITT agreed to divest assets equal to those of Hartford's, including Avis.

ITT's sales grew from about $700 million in 1960 to about $8 billion in 1970, and its profit from $29 million to $550 million. However, when the higher interest rates started eating away at profits in the late 1960s, ITT's growth slowed considerably.

In the late 1960s, the British electronics manufacturer Kolster-Brandes, KB for short, had run into trouble with its color television manufacturing, and turned to ITT for help; ITT bought out the company, and for a while, UK products were badged "ITT KB" then eventually just ITT. By the late 1970s, ITT had a good presence on the UK domestic electrical market in television, audio and portable radio products.

Brazilian Expropriation in 1962 
In February 1962, during the presidency of João Goulart, the State Governor of Rio Grande do Sul Leonel Brizola decided to expropriate a Brazilian subsidiary of ITT, the Companhia Telefônica Nacional. During the next years of Goulart's presidency, the expropriation was one of the most debated Brazilian political issues. The action from the State Governor to expropriate the company was never supported by the Brazilian president at the time and had severe implications in the Brazil–United States relations. Some historians even say that the expropriation was one of the reasons for the federal government of the United States to support the 1964 Brazilian coup d'état.

1972 Republican National Convention 
ITT became enmeshed in scandal in connection with the 1972 Republican National Convention. In May 1971, ITT president Geneen pledged $400,000 to support a proposal to hold the convention in San Diego; only $100,000 of the contribution was publicly disclosed. The Republican National Committee selected San Diego as the site in July 1971.

However, on February 29, 1972, newspaper columnist Jack Anderson disclosed an interoffice memo from ITT lobbyist Dita Beard to ITT vice president Bill Merriam, dated June 25, 1971. The memo appeared to draw a connection between ITT's contribution to the convention and the favorable settlement of a United States Department of Justice Antitrust Division lawsuit. The resulting scandal, including a Senate investigation and the threat of criminal charges, caused ITT to withdraw its support for the San Diego convention. That combined with a shortage of hotel space and problems with the proposed venue led the RNC to move the convention to Miami. Special prosecutor Leon Jaworski investigated the case but ultimately concluded there was no evidence of criminal conduct by ITT.

Nixon aides such as John Dean and Jeb Stuart Magruder have alleged that the Watergate break-in was motivated by the Committee for the Re-Election of the President's suspicion that the Democratic National Committee was making similar deals to fund its 1972 convention. This theory is supported by conversations and exchanges between President Richard Nixon and his chief of staff H. R. Haldeman before and after the break-in, as well as by testimony by E. Howard Hunt. However, this theory has also been disputed by others involved in the break-in such as G. Gordon Liddy.

Involvement in 1973 Pinochet coup in Chile 

In 1970, ITT owned 70% of CTC (the Chilean Telephone Company, now Movistar Chile) and funded El Mercurio, a Chilean right-wing newspaper. Declassified documents released by the U.S. Central Intelligence Agency in 2000 reveal that the company financially helped opponents of Salvador Allende's government prepare a military coup. On September 28, 1973, an ITT building in New York City was bombed by the Weather Underground for involvement in the coup d'état.

Post-Geneen: Hamilton and Araskog 
In March 1977 Lyman C. Hamilton was appointed CEO, and Geneen became chairman of the board. In June 1979, while Hamilton was in Asia, Geneen became aware of Hamilton's plans to divest ITT's European consumer goods business, and lobbied his fellow board members to dismiss Hamilton. In July 1979 Rand Araskog became CEO. Shortly thereafter, Araskog insisted that the board remove Geneen as Chairman, though Geneen remained on the board for four more years.

Araskog over the next two decades dismantled much of ITT, selling most of its holdings.

Starting in 1977, ITT set out to develop an ambitious new Digital Telephone Exchange, System 1240 (later System 12), which reportedly cost US$1 billion. Fortune reported that "Araskog focused the company on an all-consuming push to develop and market System 12" and "shoveled profits from good businesses into System 12's insatiable maw". System 12 was intended to operate in all markets, and in all modes, from local switches to long distance. The design was done at the Advanced Technology Center (Stamford, Connecticut and then Shelton, Connecticut). Manufacturing was by ITT's subsidiaries, such as BTM in Belgium, where the first production system was installed at Brecht, in August 1982. Initial sales, particularly in Europe and Mexico, were strong, but the new system took longer than expected to integrate, with further losses. Against the advice of headquarters, ITT Telecommunications (ITT Kellogg) in Raleigh, North Carolina undertook the conversion in the US market, and although sales were announced in 1984 and 1985, the attempt ultimately failed, in early 1986.

In 1986 ITT sold its international telecommunications product businesses, including ITT Kellogg, to the Alcatel Alsthom subsidiary of Compagnie Générale d'Electricité (CGE), forming Alcatel N.V. (Netherlands). At the time this was the world's second-largest telecommunications company. (Alcatel Alsthom S.A. subsequently merged with Lucent to become Alcatel-Lucent). ITT initially held a 37% stake, but in March 1992 it sold its remaining 30%. "The move ended the involvement of ITT in the telephone industry."

ITT Educational Services, Inc. (ESI) was spun off through an IPO in 1994, with ITT as an 83% shareholder. (In September 2016 ESI announced plans to close all of its 130 Technical Institutes in 38 states, because their students were no longer eligible for Federal aid.)  ITT merged its long-distance division with Metromedia Long Distance in March 1989, creating Metromedia-ITT. Metromedia-ITT would eventually be acquired by Long Distance Discount Services, Inc. (LDDS) in 1993. LDDS would later change its name to Worldcom in 1995.

1995 breakup 
In 1995, with Araskog still at the helm, ITT split into three separate public companies:
 ITT Corp. – In 1997, ITT Corp. completed a merger with Starwood, which wanted to acquire Sheraton Hotels and Resorts. Starwood sold ITT World Directories to VNU. By 1999, ITT completely divested from ITT/ESI; however, the schools still operated as ITT Technical Institute using the ITT name under license until its demise in 2016. Also in 1999, ITT Corp. dropped the ITT name in favor of Starwood.
 ITT Hartford (insurance) – Today ITT Hartford is still a major insurance company although it has dropped the ITT from its name altogether. The company is now known as The Hartford Financial Services Group, Inc.
 ITT Industries – ITT operated under this name until 2006 and is a major manufacturing and defense contractor business.
 On July 1, 2006, ITT Industries changed its name to ITT Corporation as a result of its shareholders vote on May 9, 2006.
 In 2011, ITT Corporation spun off two businesses. The defense business became Exelis, which was acquired by Harris in 2015; the water business became Xylem Inc.

Criminal prosecution 
In March 2007, ITT Corporation became the first major defense contractor to be convicted for criminal violations of the U.S. Arms Export Control Act. The fines resulted from ITT's outsourcing program, in which they transferred night vision goggles and classified information about countermeasures against laser weapons, including light interference filters, to engineers in Singapore, the People's Republic of China, and the United Kingdom. They were fined US$100 million although they were also given the option of spending half of that sum on research and development of new night vision technology. The United States government will assume rights to the resulting intellectual property.

In its investigation and subsequent ruling the United States Department of Justice found that the corporation went to significant lengths to circumvent rules regarding the exports including setting up a front company. According to U.S. Attorney John L. Brownlee, the company fought the investigation in order "to essentially run out the clock on the statute of limitations."

Purchases 
An agreement was reached on June 26, 2007 for ITT to acquire privately held International Motion Control (IMC) for $395 million. The deal was closed and finalized in September 2007. An announcement was made September 14, 2010 to close the Cleveland site.

An agreement was reached September 18, 2007 for ITT to buy EDO Corporation for $1.7 billion. After EDO shareholders' approval, the deal was closed and finalized on December 20, 2007.

On April 16, 2009, ITT announced it has signed a definitive agreement to acquire Laing GmbH of Germany, a privately held leading producer of energy-efficient circulator pumps primarily used in residential and commercial plumbing and heating, ventilating and air conditioning (HVAC) systems.

2011 breakup 
On January 12, 2011, ITT announced a transformation to separate the remaining company into three publicly traded independent companies. On July 14, 2011, ITT announced the names of the three companies: 

 the Industrial Process & Flow Control division to retain the name ITT Corporation
 the Water & Waste Water division, later named Xylem, symbol XYL (a reference to xylem tissue in plants)
 the Defense division to be named Exelis Inc., symbol XLS

Then-ITT stockholders subsequently owned shares in all three companies following the spinoff.

Headquarters
In 1929 ITT's headquarters were at (75) 67 Broad Street, Manhattan, New York, New York. "During World War II the building was a hub for communications with American submarines operating in the Atlantic Ocean."

From 1961 to 1989, ITT's headquarters were at 320 Park Ave., New York.

1330 Sixth Avenue in Manhattan, New York City, which was ITT's corporate headquarters prior to its merger with Starwood, was originally owned by the American Broadcasting Company (ABC), which ITT attempted to acquire in 1963. After a financial downturn, ABC moved out of the building known as "Brown Rock" and sold it to a Japanese conglomerate which then in turn leased a good portion out to ITT Corporation.

In 2022, ITT's global headquarters moved out of White Plains, NY and into Harbor Point in Stamford, CT.

ITT Avionics
ITT Avionics was a division of ITT Corporation in Nutley, New Jersey. A 300-foot research tower at ITT Avionics was built in 1947 for scientists for microwave communications systems. Research at the tower had stopped in the 1970s. On the morning of April 4, 1996 at 10:00 am, the tower was demolished with explosives to prepare the site for sale.

In October 1989, the Naval Air Systems Command (NAVAIR) awarded a contract to ITT Avionics for production of an Airborne Self-Protection Jammer (ASPJ), and a similar contract was issued to Westinghouse Electric Corporation. Westinghouse and ITT had worked together with the U S Government to develop the ASPJ. The contract was later terminated by the government for convenience because the ASPJ failed independent operational test and evaluation (OPEVAL) procedures.

In 1991 the company won a $19.6 million contract from the United States Air Force to develop the "intraflight data link", a communications system for "tactical airborne forces". In 2004 they were awarded a $24.9 million contract from the Naval Air Systems Command Weapons Division for engineering software support services provided to the Tactical Aircraft Electronic Warfare Integrated Program Team at Point Mugu, California and China Lake, California.

Consumer electronics

Through their then subsidiary Schaub Elektrik Lorenz, ITT manufactured consumer products under the ITT Schaub-Lorenz brand, such as Touring radio receivers and Ideal Color television sets employing Heliochrom picture tubes.

Some television models feature the Ideal-Computer cartridge system, featuring a slot suitable for housing an ultrasonic remote control (acting as front panel buttons while docked), a teletext decoder, or Tele-Match video game dedicated consoles (unrelated to the "ITT Telematch Processor" console, a rebrand of the Fairchild Channel F); the Ideal-Computer system was licensed to other German producers of its time.

ITT Schaub-Lorenz was also behind the Digivision, the first television employing digital signal processing of the image.

For a comparable time span, ITT had also controlled and then fully absorbed English radio and television manufacturer Kolster-Brandes.

In 1986 throughout the following year, the ITT Telecommunications division (which included Schaub-Lorenz and Kolster-Brandes) was transferred to Alcatel through the French CGE, then in 1988 the consumer electronics division was further spun off and sold to Nokia, who sold some products under the ITT Nokia brand.
Nokia closed their German TV factories in 1996, although their use of the ITT brand may have been discontinued earlier.

Since 2006, the ITT brand and logo are licensed to the Karcher corporation, which is not part of the ITT group.

Customers and programs

Federal Aviation Administration NextGen
In 2007, ITT was awarded a $207 million initial contract by the Federal Aviation Administration (FAA) to lead a team to develop and deploy the Automatic Dependent Surveillance – Broadcast (ADS-B) system. ADS-B is a key component of the FAA's NextGen air traffic control modernization program intended to increase safety and efficiency to meet the growing needs of air transportation. ITT is responsible for overall system integration and engineering and under contract options will operate and maintain the system after deployment through September 2025. The ITT team includes its partners AT&T, Thales North America, WSI, SAIC, PricewaterhouseCoopers, Aerospace Engineering, Sunhillo, Comsearch, MCS of Tampa, Pragmatics, Washington Consulting Group, Aviation Communications and Surveillance Systems (ACSS), Sandia Aerospace and NCR Corporation.

GeoEye-1

On September 6, 2008, the ITT-built imaging payload was launched aboard the GeoEye-1 satellite to provide high-resolution earth imaging. The satellite has the ability to collect images at 0.41-meter panchromatic (black and white) and 1.65-meter multispectral (color) resolution. GeoEye-1 can precisely locate an object to within three meters of its true location on the Earth's surface. The satellite will also be able to collect up to 700,000 square kilometers of panchromatic imagery per day.

See also

 ITT Visual Information Solutions
 ITT Interconnect Solutions
 Top 100 US Federal Contractors

References

Further reading
 
 
 Calvo, Angel. "State, firms and technology. The rise of multinational telecommunications companies: ITT and the Compañía Telefónica Nacional de España, 1924–1945." Business History (2008) 50#4 pp: 455–473.
 
 Ledbetter, Rosanna. "ITT: A multinational corporation in Latin America during World War II." Historian (1985) 47#4 pp: 524–537.
 
 Sisaye, Seleshi. "Contingencies influencing the effectiveness of acquisition-based corporate growth and development strategies: the case of ITT, 1920-1997." Leadership & Organization Development Journal (1998) 19#5 pp: 231–255.

External links 
 

 Emporis.com

 
Conglomerate companies of the United States
Defense companies of the United States
Defunct telecommunications companies of the United States
Companies based in White Plains, New York
American companies established in 1920
Conglomerate companies established in 1920
Manufacturing companies established in 1920
Telecommunications companies established in 1920
Manufacturing companies disestablished in 1996
1920 establishments in New York (state)
Companies listed on the New York Stock Exchange
American companies disestablished in 1996
1996 disestablishments in New York (state)
Defunct manufacturing companies based in New York (state)
Companies based in Stamford, Connecticut
Radio manufacturers